Joseph Edward Baird (November 12, 1865 – June 14, 1942) was a U.S. Representative from Ohio for one term from 1929 to 1931.

Life and career
Born at Perrysburg, Ohio, Baird attended the public schools.
He graduated from the Perrysburg High School in 1885 and from the law department of the University of Michigan at Ann Arbor in 1893.
He was admitted to the bar in 1893 but did not practice.
He moved to Bowling Green, Ohio, in 1894 and served as county clerk of Wood County 1894-1900.
He engaged as a dealer in oil and farm lands from 1900 to 1921.
He served as mayor of Bowling Green 1902-1905, and as postmaster 1910-1914.
Secretary of the Public Utilities Commission of Ohio 1921-1923.
He served as assistant secretary of state 1923-1929.

Baird was elected as a Republican to the Seventy-first Congress (March 4, 1929 – March 4, 1931).
He was an unsuccessful candidate for reelection in 1930 to the Seventy-second Congress.
He retired from active business pursuits and political activities.

Death
He died in Bowling Green, Ohio, June 14, 1942.
He was interred in Oak Grove Cemetery.

References

Sources

1865 births
1942 deaths
People from Bowling Green, Ohio
University of Michigan Law School alumni
Mayors of places in Ohio
People from Perrysburg, Ohio
Republican Party members of the United States House of Representatives from Ohio